The 4th Nigerian Teens Choice Awards was held at Transcorp Hilton in Abuja on August 9, 2015. The live show host was Funke Akindele, and Denrele Edun. It forth ceremony also featured live performances from Davido, Praiz, Seyi Shay, and Lil Kesh.

Performers

Artist
Davido
Praiz
Seyi Shay
Lil Kesh

Presenters
Funke Akindele
Denrele Edun

Nominations and winners
The following is a list of nominees and the winners:

Special Recognition Awards

References

2015 music awards
2015 awards